UFC Fight Night: Brunson vs. Machida (also known as UFC Fight Night 119) was a mixed martial arts event produced by the Ultimate Fighting Championship held on October 28, 2017, at Ginásio do Ibirapuera in São Paulo, Brazil.

Background
A middleweight bout between former UFC Light Heavyweight Champion Lyoto Machida and Derek Brunson headlined this event.

A light heavyweight bout between former title challenger Glover Teixeira and Misha Cirkunov was expected to take place at this event, but was delayed and rescheduled for UFC on Fox: Lawler vs. dos Anjos after a recent hand surgery for Teixeira was slow to heal.

On September 19, promotional newcomer Carlos Felipe was flagged for a potential USADA violation stemming from an out-of-competition sample collected July 29. Therefore, he was pulled from his UFC debut against Christian Colombo. He was replaced by fellow promotional newcomer Marcelo Golm. On October 20, it was announced that Felipe accepted a two-year suspension retroactive to the date of his provisional suspension. He tested positive for metabolites of stanozolol, 16β‐hydroxy‐stanozolol and 3’‐hydroxy‐stanozolol.

Augusto Mendes was expected to face promotional newcomer Boston Salmon at the event. However, Mendes pulled out of the fight on October 3 citing a leg injury. He was replaced a week later by promotional newcomer Raoni Barcelos. Subsequently, Salmon pulled out of the fight on October 20 citing his own injury. As a result, Barcelos was removed from the card as well.

On October 6, it was announced that Luan Chagas fractured his foot and pulled out of his welterweight bout against Niko Price. He was replaced by Vicente Luque.

Results

Bonus awards
The following fighters were awarded $50,000 bonuses:
Fight of the Night: Elizeu Zaleski dos Santos vs. Max Griffin  
Performance of the Night: Derek Brunson and Pedro Munhoz

See also
List of UFC events
2017 in UFC

References

UFC Fight Night
2017 in mixed martial arts
Mixed martial arts in Brazil
Sport in São Paulo
October 2017 sports events in South America
Sports competitions in São Paulo